The North–South Expressway Central Link  also known as ELITE, is a  controlled-access highway in Malaysia, running between Shah Alam in Selangor and Nilai in Negeri Sembilan. The expressway joins the separated northern and southern sections of the North–South Expressway, allowing interstate traffic to bypass Kuala Lumpur. The expressway also serves as a primary access route to Putrajaya and Kuala Lumpur International Airport.

History

The new expressway bypass for the North–South Expressway was announced in 1994 in conjunction with the opening of the main routes of the North–South Expressway. Construction started in March 1994 and was completed in August 1997. The first section, between Shah Alam and USJ, was opened in June 1996. In October 1997, the remainder of the expressway opened to traffic. The Putrajaya Link was opened in 2000.

In September 2003, the company Expressway Lingkaran Tengah Sdn Bhd (ELITE) became a member company of PLUS Expressways.

On 28 February 2013, the incomplete bridge being built by the Selangor State Development Corporation at the interchange to Bandar Nusaputra on the Putrajaya Link collapsed due to a water pipe leak. No casualties or injuries were reported.

Features
 Closed toll system (refer to PLUS)
 Batu Tiga flyover longest in NSE network
 Act as bypass from bustling Kuala Lumpur travelling from north to south and vice versa
 Smooth access to KLIA
 PLUS Speedway (formerly ELITE Speedway) in USJ Rest and Service Area is the first highway go-kart circuit in Malaysia
 Safety CS Team (PROPEL) roadworks

Toll rates
ELITE applied closed toll system in their entire route with toll plazas built in all their access points and vehicles are charged based on the distance travelled between their entry and exit points. Below is the rate for a full journey between their first interchange (Ebor) and their last interchange (Bandar Serenia):

ELITE integrates their toll collection system with New Klang Valley Expressway (NKVE) and the northern and southern route of North-South Expressway (up to their respective terminus of Sungai Besi, Bukit Raja, Juru and Skudai toll plaza), so vehicles travelling between these expressway network will have their fare calculated with combination of distance travelled in other expressway as well.

Vehicles do not need to go through any plaza tolls if they wish to pass through ELITE to travel to these other expressways, but will have their fare includes distance travelled between start and end of this expressway as well when they exit from other connected expressways.

List of interchanges, and rest and service areas

Putrajaya Link

Putrajaya Link, or Persiaran Barat E6, is an expressway within North–South Expressway Central Link and also a major interchange in same expressway. The expressway connects Putrajaya Interchange to the Lebuh Sentosa interchange.

The Kilometre Zero of the expressway is located at Putrajaya Interchange.

History
Construction started in 1998. The Putrajaya Link which was connected to Putrajaya was opened in 2000.

In September 2003, the company Expressway Lingkaran Tengah Sdn Bhd (ELITE) is now a member company of PLUS Expressways Berhad

Incidents
On 28 February 2013, the under construction bridge at the Bandar Nusaputra Interchange Exit 613, kilometre P2.4 of the Putrajaya Link, a part of the North–South Expressway Central Link E6 collapse caused by water pipe leakage. No casualties or injuries were reported. The bridge was built by the Selangor State Development Corporation (PKNS) and not PLUS Expressways.

List of interchanges

References

External links
 PLUS Expressway Berhad
 ELITE
 Malaysian Highway Authority

1996 establishments in Malaysia
Expressways in Malaysia
Expressways and highways in the Klang Valley
Roads in Selangor
North–South Expressway (Malaysia)